Robert Palikuča (born 24 May 1978) is a Croatian football executive and former player. He was the sporting director of HNK Rijeka until August 2022.

Career
On 6 April 2019, Palikuča was announced as the new sporting director of 1. FC Nürnberg.

References

1978 births
Living people
People from Bückeburg
Footballers from Lower Saxony
Association football defenders
Croatian footballers
FSV Salmrohr players
FC St. Pauli players
Fortuna Düsseldorf players
Fortuna Düsseldorf II players
3. Liga players
Croatian expatriate footballers
Expatriate footballers in Germany
Croatian expatriate sportspeople in Germany
Croatian football managers
HNK Rijeka non-playing staff